Epicrocis gratella is a species of snout moth in the genus Epicrocis. It was described by Francis Walker in 1863 and is known from Sri Lanka.

References

Moths described in 1863
Phycitini
Endemic fauna of Sri Lanka